Dispatched were a Swedish melodic death metal band from Södertälje (originally from the Gnesta Municipality) formed in 1992.

History
Dispatched was formed just before New Year's Eve, 1991 by Daniel Lundberg and Krister Andersson. Jonas Kimbrell and Emanuel Astrom joined the band later that same year. They then recorded their first demo, Dispatched into External, at Stone Studio.

In early 1993, they recorded two more demo tapes that helped the band gain more positive attention from labels. One year later, Dispatched returned to the Unisound studio to record a whole eleven-song album, which was supposed to be released in full by Exhumed Productions in Germany. Kimbrell and Åström decided to leave the band right after this recording.

Lundberg and Andersson continued alone for the rest of 1994, buying a four-channel studio and not rehearsing at all. However, by the end of 1995 Fredrik Larsson joined the band and they started to rehearse again. Until then, Exhumed Productions had only released four of the eleven songs as a 7-inch EP entitled Awaiting the End. Right before the summer of 1996, Andersson had grown tired of the band and left. Exhumed Productions soon released Blackshadows, also taken from the recording done in 1994.

Lundberg and Larsson continued to rehearse and after the summer they found a new drummer, Mattias Hellman and keyboardist/vocalist Fredrik Karlsson. The band planned to record some new songs until the summer of 1997 until Hellman was replaced by Dennis Nilsson. After some changes of studio dates, Dispatched finally recorded four songs in Studio Titan in September 1997, later to be released as Returned to Your Mind. Nilsson became a full member of the band and a second guitar player, Emil Larsson, joined as well in the beginning of 1998.

With this lineup, Dispatched began rehearsing for a new release. Between August 3 and 7, 1998, Dispatched visited The Abyss, with Tommy Tägtgren to record the MCD Promised Land. Dispatched signed a one-MCD deal with Kshatryas Productions of Germany, and released Promised Land in late 1998.

In 1999, the band began rehearsing for a full-length album. In October, they entered Studio Abyss again with Tägtgren as producer. Two weeks were booked, but Dispatched was well-prepared and used only twelve days for the recording of ten new songs. The band had already received offers from several record companies before the session, but they refused to sign anything. Now with a whole album, entitled Motherwar, they sent out a few copies to various record companies again to see the reaction. The reviews were extremely positive and Dispatched was offered many deals from different labels. Dispatched eventually signed on Music for Nations in March 2000 to release Motherwar.

Following the release of Motherwar, Larsson was replaced by Mattias Hellman on bass, and the band went to Studio Fredman in 2001 to record the band's second album. However, due to some problems, this record was never released. The band continued to write songs and do some live shows, but in late 2002, members of Dispatched decided to break up.

Despite their break-up, many of Dispatched's fans requested a release of the band's last unreleased album, Terrorizer: The Last Chapter..., and a deal was made in 2003 to release this recording under Medusa Productions.

The band apparently got back together in 2004, and is currently on hold as they have no place to rehearse since Daniel Lundberg has moved far from the other band members.

Band members

Current
 Fredrik Karlsson – vocals, bass guitar, keyboards (Dark Edge, Mind in Haze, Demon Seed)
 Emil Larsson – guitars (Massiv Ångest, M.M.I)
 Daniel Lundberg – guitars, keyboards (Dark Edge)
 Dennis Nilsson – drums (M.M.I) (G.I.L) Demon seed)

Former
 Krister Andersson – vocals (1991–1996)
 Jonas Kimbrell – bass guitar (1992–1994) (The Marble Icon, Cryptic Art)
 Emanuel Åström – drums (1992–1994)
 Dennis Hultin – guitar (1997)
 Ulrika Forsberg – guitar (1993)
 Fredrik Larsson – drums (1991, 1995–2000) (Dark Edge)
 Mattias Hellman – bass guitar (2000–2002) (ex-PitBullfarm, Scarecaows)
 Petter Furå – bass guitar (live 2002) (Ashes,Mind in haze, Malison Rogue)

Discography

Demos/EPs
 Dispatched into External (1992, demo)
 Promo 1993 (1993, promo)
 Promo 2 (1993, promo)
 Blackshadows (1994, demo)
 Awaiting the End (1995, EP)
 Blackshadows (1996, EP)
 Returned to Your Mind (1997, EP)
 Promised Land (1998, EP)
 Terrorizer (2001, demo)

Albums
 Blackshadows (1994, Exhumed Productions)
 Motherwar (2000, Music for Nations)
 Terrorizer: The Last Chapter... (2003,Khaos/Medusa Productions)
 Terrorizer (2005, Crash Music/Rising Realm)

Singles
 "Motherwar" (promotion only)

References

Swedish melodic death metal musical groups
Blackened death metal musical groups
Musical groups established in 1992